"Kim" is a song by American rapper Eminem that appears on his 2000 album The Marshall Mathers LP. The song reflects intense anger and hatred toward his then-wife Kim Mathers and features Eminem imitating her voice, and ends with him murdering her and later putting her body in the trunk of his car.

"Kim" was the first song Eminem recorded for the album, shortly after finishing work on The Slim Shady LP in late 1998. He wrote it, along with "'97 Bonnie & Clyde" (where Eminem and his daughter go to the lake to dispose of Kim's dead body),  when he and Kim were having relationship problems and Kim was preventing him from seeing his daughter Hailie. Despite its controversial graphic content, it is often highlighted as one of Eminem's most memorable songs.

"Kim" is the third song of Eminem about Kim, the first of which is "Searchin'" from his debut album "Infinite", and the second – '97 Bonnie & Clyde" from the album "Slim Shady EP" and "The Slim Shady LP".

On the clean version of The Marshall Mathers LP, this song is replaced by a clean version of "The Kids" (an unedited version can be found on the CD single of "The Way I Am" along with the UK and deluxe editions of The Marshall Mathers LP).

Critical reception
The Rolling Stone album review of The Marshall Mathers LP stated that:

While Entertainment Weekly wrote that:

In 2001, Robert Christgau told Rolling Stone that songs like "Kim" and Ghostface Killah's "Wildflower"  employ sexist content in an artful way that offers insight into its pathology, citing them as exceptions to the usual "reflexive and violent sexism" popularized by rap and heavy metal: "[T]he nonsense that 'Kim' advocates the murder of wives who cheat – what an absurdity, and what a disgusting absurdity on the part of people who don't give Eminem credit for being more intelligent than they are, quite frankly."

In 2013 Complex ranked "Kim" at #21 on their list of the 25 most violent rap songs of all time and at #4 on their list of the 35 most depressing rap songs.

References

2000 songs
Eminem songs
Songs written by Eminem
Songs about marriage
Songs about revenge
2000 controversies
Horrorcore songs
Songs about domestic violence
Obscenity controversies in music
Sequel songs
Uxoricide in fiction
Answer songs